Events in the year 1915 in Brazil.

Incumbents

Federal government 
 President: Venceslau Brás 
 Vice President: Urbano Santos da Costa Araújo

Governors 
 Alagoas: Clodoaldo da Fonseca (until 12 June); João Batista Accioli Jr. (from 12 June)
 Amazonas: Jônatas de Freitas Pedrosa
 Bahia: José Joaquim Seabra
 Ceará: Benjamin Liberato Barroso
 Goiás: Joaquim Augusto da Costa Marques, then Caetano Manuel de Faria e Albuquerque
 until June 30: Salatiel Simões de Lima
 from June 30: Joaquim Rufino Ramos Jubé
 Maranhão: Herculano Nina Parga
 Mato Grosso: 
 Minas Gerais: Delfim Moreira
 Pará: Enéas Martins
 Paraíba: 
 until 24 July: João Castro Pinto
 from  24 July: Antônio da Silva Pessoa
 Paraná: Carlos Cavalcanti de Albuquerque
 Pernambuco:
 until 18 December: Emídio Dantas Barreto
 from 18 December: Manuel Antônio Pereira Borba
 Piauí: Miguel de Paiva Rosa
 Rio Grande do Norte: Joaquim Ferreira Chaves
 Rio Grande do Sul: Antônio Augusto Borges de Medeiros
 Santa Catarina:
 São Paulo: 
 Sergipe:

Vice governors 
 Rio Grande do Norte:
 São Paulo:

Events 
6 August - Brazilian-born Bernardino Luís Machado Guimarães becomes President of Portugal.

Culture and the arts
29 January - Heitor Villa-Lobos gives the first in a series of chamber concerts; one of the new works he introduces during this year is his Cello Concerto no 1.

Births 

5 January - Humberto Teixeira, musician (died 1979)
15 January - Maria Lenk, swimmer (died 2007)
20 April - Aurora Miranda, entertainer (died 2005)
18 October - Grande Otelo, Afro-Brazilian scholar, artist, and politician, real name Bernardes de Souza Prata (died 1993)

Deaths 
18 January - Bernardino José de Campos Júnior, politician, second and sixth governor of the State of São Paulo (born 1841)
2 February - João Cardoso de Meneses e Sousa, Baron of Paranapiacaba, poet, translator, journalist, lawyer and politician (born 1827)
27 November - Orville Adalbert Derby, American geologist who became a Brazilian citizen (born 1851; suicide)

References

See also
 1915 in Brazilian football

 
1910s in Brazil
Brazil
Years of the 20th century in Brazil
Brazil